Almokalant is a drug used to treat arrhythmia.  It is a potassium channel blocker. It has been found to have teratogenic effects in rats.

See also
 Vernakalant

References

Potassium channel blockers
Nitriles
Sulfoxides